Calvyn Justus (born 14 December 1995) is a South African swimmer. He competed in the men's 4 × 200 metre freestyle relay event at the 2016 Summer Olympics. He is an alumnus of Westville Boys' High School. In 2018, Justus placed third in the 4x100 medley relay at the Commonwealth Games, along with teammates Chad Le Clos, Cameron van der Burgh and Brad Tandy.

References

External links
 

1995 births
Living people
South African male swimmers
Olympic swimmers of South Africa
Swimmers at the 2016 Summer Olympics
Commonwealth Games medallists in swimming
Place of birth missing (living people)
Swimmers at the 2018 Commonwealth Games
Commonwealth Games silver medallists for South Africa
Commonwealth Games bronze medallists for South Africa
African Games gold medalists for South Africa
African Games medalists in swimming
Swimmers at the 2015 African Games
Swimmers from Johannesburg
20th-century South African people
21st-century South African people
Medallists at the 2018 Commonwealth Games